Volha Zinkevich (born 8 September 1975) is a Paralympian athlete from Belarus competing mainly in category F12 long jump events.

She competed in the 2000 Summer Paralympics in Sydney, Australia under the name Volha Shuliakouskaya. There she competed in the T12 100m, the F12 long jump winning a bronze medal and the T12 200m where she won the gold medal.  In 2004 in Athens, Greece she competed in the 400m, won silver medals in both the T12 100m and 200m and won a gold medal in the F12 long jump.  Four years later in Beijing, China she was not as successful, failing to win a medal in the T12 100m, 200m or 400m but did manage to win a silver in the F12 long jump.

External links
 

Paralympic athletes of Belarus
Athletes (track and field) at the 2000 Summer Paralympics
Athletes (track and field) at the 2004 Summer Paralympics
Athletes (track and field) at the 2008 Summer Paralympics
Athletes (track and field) at the 2012 Summer Paralympics
Paralympic gold medalists for Belarus
Paralympic silver medalists for Belarus
Paralympic bronze medalists for Belarus
Belarusian female long jumpers
Belarusian female sprinters
Living people
1975 births
Medalists at the 2000 Summer Paralympics
Medalists at the 2004 Summer Paralympics
Medalists at the 2008 Summer Paralympics
Medalists at the World Para Athletics European Championships
Paralympic medalists in athletics (track and field)
Visually impaired long jumpers
Visually impaired sprinters
Paralympic sprinters
Paralympic long jumpers
Belarusian people with disabilities
Blind people